House of Liu was the ruling house of the Han dynasty (206 BC–9 AD, 25–220 AD).

House of Liu may also refer to:
The ruling house of Shu Han (221–263)
The ruling house of Former Zhao (304–329)
The ruling house of Xia (407–431)
The ruling house of Liu Song dynasty (420–479)
The ruling house of Southern Han (917–971)
The ruling house of Later Han (947–951) 
The ruling house of Northern Han (951–979)